The Huawei Honor 5X (also known as Huawei GR5) is a mid-range Android smartphone manufactured by Huawei as part of the Huawei Honor X series. It uses the Qualcomm Snapdragon 616 processor and an aluminum body design. It was first released in China in October 2015, and was released in the United States and India in January 2016.

Specifications

Hardware
The Honor 5X has a metal-clad design using "aviation-grade aluminum" for its body. It uses a 5.5-inch 1080p fully laminated display with a pixel density of 401 ppi, octa-core Qualcomm Snapdragon 616 processor with an Adreno 405 GPU, 2 or 3 GB of DDR3 RAM, and 16 GB of internal storage. It has "Fingerprint 2.0 technology",which allows user to directly unlock the smartphone with just user input using an FPC1020 fingerprint scanner.
The Honor 5X comes with 13 Megapixel rear camera with dual-LED flash, f/2.0 aperture and Phase Detection AutoFocus. It has a f/2.4 5 Megapixel front facing camera. It comes in 16GB in-built storage which can be expanded up to 128GB using MicroSD card and has a 3000 mAh battery.

Software
The Honor 5X was originally marketed with Emotion User Interface v3.1, a customisation of Android Lollipop; Android Marshmallow and EMUI 4 updates followed. The device is officially supported by LineageOS v14.1 up to v16.0 (Android Pie)(Beta version is v17.0 with android 10), a free and open-source operating system based on Android (Operating System). The LineageOS release was preceded by unofficial builds of CyanogenMod v13.0, which is based on Android Marshmallow.

History
The Honor 5X was first announced at an event held by Huawei in Chengdu on 27 October 2015.
On January 28, it was listed on Flipkart and Amazon for sale.

References
Notes
Unlocking Honor 5x Bootloader How To Unlock Bootloader Of Huawei Phones Official Method

Honor 5x Stock Firmware: Complete List Of Official Honor 5x Stock Rom All Models
Sources

Android (operating system) devices
Mobile phones introduced in 2015
Huawei Honor
Discontinued smartphones
Mobile phones with 4K video recording